Schwarzbuch Kapitalismus: ein Abgesang auf die Marktwirtschaft (The Black Book of Capitalism: A farewell to the market economy) is a book written by the German Marxian critical-theorist Robert Kurz in 1999. In an interview, Kurz described his book as a "radical-critical history of modernization since the 18th century". The book has, as of 2022, not been translated into other languages from the original German.

Kurz had originally preferred the title The Satanic Mills for his work, but decided with his editor, in reaction to The Black Book of Communism, to title the book The Black Book of Capitalism. Unlike The Black Book of Communism, Kurz's book does not attempt to list the crimes of capitalism, as Kurz explains that he doesn't "think that even 100 thick volumes would suffice". Instead, this work is a history of the three great industrial revolutions, the legitimization of the social consequences of capitalism, the socialist labour movement viewed as engrained in bourgeois modernization, and the crises that can be viewed as endemic under the capitalist system. His economic and socio-historical reconstruction of capitalism has been described by one reviewer as serving the purpose of putting the crimes of communism into “the shadow of those of capitalism”.

Reception
Kurz’s book has been received as a provocative work of non-fiction, and has been successful in the German market. In the Frankfurter Rundschau, the Black Book of Capitalism has been acclaimed as  a “bold initiative” in a time of “social taboo on criticizing capitalism”, and hailed the work as a “brilliant and radical critique of the global system of capitalism”. As well as critical acclaim, the book has also been reviewed as being "militant and scandalous" by German political scientist Ralf Altenhof.

See also
Post-Marxism
Criticism of capitalism
Le Livre noir du capitalisme
Le Livre noir du colonialisme
The Black Book of Communism

References

Bibliography

External links
 Stephan Grigat: Robert Kurz "Schwarzbuch Kapitalismus" . Streifzüge, February 2000.
 Michael Heinrich. Blase im Blindflug. Hält das „Schwarzbuch Kapitalismus“ von Robert Kurz, was der Titel verspricht? . Konkret March 2000, p. 40-41.

1999 non-fiction books
German non-fiction books
Books critical of capitalism
Marxist books
20th-century German literature